Association football is the most popular sport in Sweden, with over 240,000 licensed players (approximately 56,000 women and 184,000 men) with another 240,000 youth players. There are around 3,200 active clubs fielding over 8,500 teams, which are playing on the 7,900 pitches available in the country. Football was first played in Sweden in the 1870s, the first championship was decided in 1896 and the Swedish Football Association was founded in 1904. Despite being a relatively small country population-wise, both the men's and women's national teams and the club teams have gained rather large success from time to time.

History

Football, along with other organised sports, came to Sweden in the 1870s and was mainly exercised by gymnastics clubs which exercised most of the sports of the time. England and Scotland were the main sources of inspiration and it is thus not strange that football gained popularity fast, with the first agreement of rules made in 1885 by the clubs active in Gothenburg, Stockholm and Visby. The first international club match was played in 1890 and the first match with modern rules was played two years later in 1892.

The first association to administer a Swedish national football tournament was Svenska Idrottsförbundet, founded 1895 in Gothenburg, the dominating football town in Sweden, at the time. The association arranged Svenska Mästerskapet in 1896 which Örgryte IS won. The tournament was played until 1925 when the first national league, Allsvenskan, was started. In the late 1890s, the IFK associations began playing football, and by 1901, the first Kamratmästerskap (IFK championship) in football was arranged.

Football has grown since and there is currently around 3,300 clubs with 32,700 teams and with one million members, whereof about half a million are active players, altogether.

League system

The current national league system administered by the football association is organised as 1-1-2-6-12, where Allsvenskan is the highest Swedish level and Superettan the second highest, followed by two third level (Division 1), six fourth level (Division 2) and twelve fifth level leagues (Division 3). Below Division 3 are several lower leagues, in some areas going all the way down to the ninth level, (Division 7), or in the case of Upplands FF, the tenth level (Division 8), overseen by regional football associations.

Cup system

The national cup Svenska Cupen is played by all 32 teams from Allsvenskan and Superettan and 64 teams from the lower divisions. Which 64 teams from the lower divisions that get to play is decided by the number of licensed players in the football districts.

International titles

The Sweden national football team played its first international football match in 1908 against Norway. The team has been fairly successful with one 2nd place in the 1958 World Cup, two third places (1950 and 1994) and a victory in the 1948 Summer Olympics. The Sweden women's national football team was once leading in the development of women's football and won the unofficial European Championships in 1984, a success the team has not managed to repeat, however, it won a silver in the 2003 World Cup.

Swedish clubs have appeared in European club competition finals 10 times. In men's football, IFK Göteborg won the UEFA Cup twice, 1982 and 1987, and Malmö FF lost the European Cup final in 1979. In the women's game, Umeå IK won the UEFA Women's Cup twice, in 2003 and 2004, and lost in the final in 2001, 2007 and 2008; Djurgårdens IF Dam (then known as Djurgården/Älvsjö) lost in the final in 2005; and Tyresö FF lost in the final of the renamed UEFA Women's Champions League in 2014.

Seasons

Swedish football began to have regular seasons from 1924 on, when Allsvenskan started. Before that, tournaments were played irregularly. Svenska Mästerskapet for example, the decider of the Swedish Champions in the early years, was played spring-autumn, while Svenska Serien, the national league, was played autumn-spring. Some years, it was played spring-autumn-spring due to various reasons, and other years it was not played at all due to economical trouble. In 1959, Swedish football changed from autumn-spring to spring-autumn seasons. Allsvenskan has not been suspended any season since its start.

The last five seasons:
2013
2014
2015
2016
2017

Swedish champions

The current Swedish Champions title is held by the winners of Allsvenskan. The title has existed since 1896, although no club was given the title between 1926 and 1930. The 117 championships have been won by 19 different football clubs so far, with the top four title holders being Malmö FF (20 titles), IFK Göteborg (18 titles), IFK Norrköping (13 titles) and Örgryte IS (12). Clubs from the three largest cities in Sweden, Stockholm, Gothenburg and Malmö have held the title the majority of the seasons, 78 in total, but there is also an example of a very small municipality being able to field a club capable of winning the title, as Åtvidabergs FF from Åtvidaberg held the title twice, in 1972 and 1973.

The last five holders of the title:
2014 - Malmö FF
2015 - IFK Norrköping
2016 - Malmö FF
2017 - Malmö FF
2018 - AIK
2019 - Djurgårdens IF
2020 - Malmö FF

Women's Football

Competition records

European Cup
The following teams have advanced to elimination rounds in the European Cup.
Runner-up: Malmö FF (1978–79)
Semi-finals: IFK Göteborg (1985–86)
Quarter-finals: Djurgården (1955–56), IFK Malmö (1960–61), Åtvidabergs FF (1974–75), IFK Göteborg (1984–85, 1988–89)

UEFA Champions League
The following teams have advanced to elimination rounds in the UEFA Champions League.
Quarter-finals: IFK Göteborg (1994–95)
Group Stage: IFK Göteborg (1992–93,  1996–97, 1997–98), AIK (1999–2000), Helsingborgs IF (2000–01), Malmö FF (2014–15, 2015–16, 2021-2021)

UEFA Cup
The following teams have advanced to elimination rounds in the UEFA Cup.
Champions: IFK Göteborg (1981–82, 1986–87)
Round of 32: Helsingborgs IF (2007–08)

UEFA Europa League
The following teams have advanced to elimination rounds in the UEFA Europa League.
Round of 32: Östersund (2017–18), Malmö FF (2018–19, 2019–20)

UEFA Cup Winners' Cup

The following teams have advanced to elimination rounds in the UEFA Cup Winner’s Cup

Quarter-finals:  Malmö FF (1974-1975, 1986-1987), IFK Göteborg (1979-1980), AIK (1996-1997),  Åtvidabergs FF (1971-1972),

UEFA Women's Champions League
The following teams have advanced to elimination rounds in the UEFA Women's Champions League or its predecessor, the UEFA Women's Cup.

Club names are current, not necessarily those used when a club competed in a given season.  
Champions: Umeå IK (2003, 2004)
Runner-up:
 Umeå IK (2002, 2007, 2008)
 Djurgårdens IF Dam (2005)
 Tyresö FF (2014)
Semi-finals:
 FC Rosengård (2004)
 Umeå IK (2010)
Quarter-finals:
 Umeå IK (2005, 2009)
 Djurgårdens IF Dam (2006)
 Linkopings FC (2011, 2015)
 Kopparbergs/Göteborg FC (2012, 2013)
 FC Rosengård (2012, 2013, 2015, 2016)
Round of 16:
 Linkopings FC (2010)
 FC Rosengård (2014)
 KIF Örebro DFF (2016)

Largest football stadiums in Sweden 

Football stadiums with a capacity of at least 20,000 are included.

Notes

References
Print

Online

External links

Swedish Football Association